The 15th edition of the annual Hypo-Meeting took place on June 17 and June 18, 1989 in Götzis, Austria. The track and field competition featured a decathlon (men) and a heptathlon (women) event.

Men's Decathlon

Schedule

June 17

June 18

Records

Results

Women's Heptathlon

Schedule

June 17

June 18

Records

Notes

References
 decathlon2000
 decathlonfans
 1989 Year Ranking Decathlon

1989
Hypo-Meeting
Hypo-Meeting